Contested elections in American history at the presidential level, involve serious allegations by top officials that the election was "stolen." Such allegations appeared in 1824, 1876, 1912, 1960, 2000, and 2020.  Typically the precise allegations have changed over time.

1800 confusion 

In 1800 the Republican Party won the election and intended for party leader Thomas Jefferson to be president and New York politician Aaron Burr to be vice president. By an oversight both men were tied in the electoral college, and Burr wanted the job,  The decision went to the House where the Federalists were powerful enough to stop Jefferson. Federalist leader Alexander Hamilton was a long-time foe of Jefferson but he deeply distrusted Burr.  Hamilton helped arrange for Jefferson to be elected president and Burr vice president. A constitutional amendment was passed to prevent similar confusion. In 1804 Burr killed Hamilton in a duel.

1824 Jackson denounces "Corrupt Bargain" 

In 1824 political parties were very weak, and the voters had the choice of four candidates: Andrew Jackson won had the most popular and electoral votes but lacked a majority. John Quincy Adams was second; William H. Crawford was third; and Henry Clay was fourth. According to the Constitution the House of Representatives had to choose among the top three. Henry Clay was now out of the running but as Speaker of the House he played a major role in the decision. He helped Adams win, and Adams rewarded him as Secretary of State. To a friend Clay explained that Jackson’s militarism threatened American democracy:As a friend of Liberty, and to the permanence of our institutions, I cannot consent…by contributing to the election of a military chieftain, to give the strongest guarantee that this republic will march in the fatal road which has conducted every other republic to ruin. 
Jackson was livid: "The Judas of the West has closed the contract and will receive the thirty pieces of silver. His end will be the same." Jackson cried foul—the election was stolen by a "corrupt bargain" between Adams and Clay. He crusaded against the devils and defeated Adams in 1828, using partisan rhetoric that Robert V. Remini says was, "almost totally devoid of truth."

1876: The result is still disputed 

In 1876 saw Republican Rutherford B. Hayes awarded the White House by a partisan special Congressional commission. The result remains among the most disputed ever. Although it is not disputed that Democrat Samuel J. Tilden outpolled Hayes in the popular vote, there were wide allegations of electoral fraud, election violence, and other disfranchisement of predominantly Republican Black voters. After a first count of votes, Tilden had won 184 electoral votes to Hayes's 165, with 20 votes from four states unresolved. In Florida, Louisiana, and South Carolina, both parties reported their candidate to have won the state. In Oregon, one elector was replaced after being declared illegal for having been an "elected or appointed official." The question of who should have been awarded those 20 electoral votes remains in dispute among historians, with most suggesting the Republicans were guilty.

1912 Roosevelt attacks Taft 

In 1908 President Theodore Roosevelt made sure the Republicans Party nominated his close friend William Howard Taft for president. Taft won but was Roosevelt was dissatisfied and challenged Taft for the 1912 nomination. Roosevelt accused Taft of "stealing " the Republican nomination. Roosevelt thereupon ran a third party ticket, allowing Democrat Woodrow Wilson to win. According to Lewis L. Gould,    Roosevelt saw Taft as the agent of "the forces of reaction and of political crookedness"....Roosevelt had become the most dangerous man in American history, said Taft, "because of his hold upon the less intelligent voters and the discontented."  The Republican National Committee, dominated by the Taft forces, awarded 235 delegates to the president and 19 to Roosevelt, thereby ensuring Taft's renomination....Firm in his conviction that the nomination was being stolen from him, Roosevelt....told cheering supporters that there was "a great moral issue" at stake...."Fearless of the future; unheeding of our individual fates; with unflinching hearts and undimmed eyes; we stand at Armageddon, and we battle for the Lord!"

2000 election depends on Florida 

On election night, it was unclear who had won, with the state of Florida still undecided. The final returns showed that Republican George W. Bush had won Florida by 537 votes out of six million cast. The loser—the Democrat—was allowed by state law to demand recounts in selected counties.  They wanted recounts in Democratic strongholds where most disputed votes were for Al Gore, the Democratic candidate. Republicans sued on the grounds the narrow recount unfairly ignored voters in other counties. A month-long series of legal battles led to the highly controversial 5–4 Supreme Court decision Bush v. Gore, which accepted the Republican argument, ended the recount, and left Bush the winner by 500 votes and the he became president.

2020: Trump claims his victory was "stolen" 

The stolen election conspiracy theory falsely claims that the 2020 United States presidential election was "stolen" from Donald Trump, who lost that election to Joe Biden. It serves to justify attempts to overturn the 2020 United States presidential election, including the 2021 storming of the United States Capitol. A particular variant of it is the "Soros stole the election" conspiracy theory that claims that George Soros stole the election from Trump. Polls conducted since the aftermath of the 2020 election have consistently shown that majority of Republicans falsely believe that the election was "stolen" from Trump.

See also
 2008 United States Senate election in Minnesota
 List of conspiracy theories 
 American election campaigns in the 19th century

References

Further reading
 Argersinger, Peter H. "New perspectives on election fraud in the Gilded Age." Political Science Quarterly (1985) 100#4 pp. 669–687.
 Baum, Dale, and James L. Hailey. “Lyndon Johnson’s Victory in the 1948 Texas Senate Race: A Reappraisal.” Political Science Quarterly 109#4, (1994)  pp. 595–613. online
 Bensel, Richard F. The American ballot box in the mid-nineteenth century (Cambridge University Press, 2004).

 Campbell, Tracy. Deliver the Vote: A History of Election Fraud, An American Political Tradition, 1742–2004 (Basic Books, 2005) online
 Dinkin, Robert J. Campaigning in America: A history of election practices (Praeger, 1989).

 
 Fitzpatrick, Gerard J., and E. J. Dionne. “Bush v. Gore: Popular Sovereignty, Fundamental Law, and the Post-Election Battle for the Presidency.” Polity 35#1 (2002), pp. 153–68. online

 Foley, Edward B. "The Lake Wobegone Recount: Minnesota's Disputed 2008 US Senate Election." Election Law Journal 10.2 (2011): 129-164.

 Foley, Edward B. "Preparing for a Disputed Presidential Election: An Exercise in Election Risk Assessment and Management." Loyola University Chicago Law Journal 51 (2019): 309+. online

 Gellman, Irwin F. Campaign of the Century: Kennedy, Nixon, and the Election of 1960 (Yale UP, 2022) excerpt.

 Hasen, Richard L. "Identifying and Minimizing the Risk of Election Subversion and Stolen Elections in the Contemporary United States." Harvard Law Review Forum. Vol. 135. (2022). pp 1-32.online

  chapter 2.

 Johnson, Marc C. Tuesday Night Massacre: Four Senate Elections and the Radicalization of the Republican Party (U of Oklahoma Press, 2021) 1980 Senate races saw bitter defeats of Frank Church, Birch Bayh, John Culver, and George McGovern and weakened moderates in GOP.

 Kallina, Edmund F. Courthouse over White House: Chicago and the Presidential Election of 1960 (University of Central Florida Press, 1988).

 Kuo, Didi, and Jan Teorell. "Illicit tactics as substitutes: election fraud, ballot reform, and contested congressional elections in the United States, 1860-1930." Comparative Political Studies 50.5 (2017): 665-696.
 Morris, Roy. Fraud of the Century: Rutherford B. Hayes, Samuel Tilden, and the Stolen Election of 1876 (Simon & Schuster, 2003). 311 pp.
 Ortiz, Paul. Emancipation betrayed: The hidden history of black organizing and white violence in Florida from Reconstruction to the bloody election of 1920 (U of California Press, 2005). 

 Rehnquist, William H.  Centennial Crisis: The Disputed Election of 1876 (2004), popular history by the Chief Justice of the Supreme Court. online; also see  online review

 Shofner, Jerrell H. “Florida Courts and the Disputed Election of 1876.” Florida Historical Quarterly 48#1, (1969), pp. 26–46. online
 Summers, Mark Wahlgren. The Era of Good Stealings (1993), Scholarly study covers corruption 1868–1877; online
 Woodward, C. Vann, ed. Responses of the Presidents to Charges of Misconduct (1974) scholarly coverage of all major election disputes. online

Historiography and memory
 Berlinski, Nicolas, et al. "The effects of unsubstantiated claims of voter fraud on confidence in elections." Journal of Experimental Political Science (2021): 1-16.

 Minnite, Lorraine C. The Myth of Voter Fraud (Cornell University Press, 2011). online

 Norris, Pippa. "The new research agenda studying electoral integrity." Electoral Studies 32.4 (2013): 563-575.
 Norris, Pippa, Sarah Cameron, and Thomas Wynter, eds. Electoral Integrity in America: Securing Democracy (Oxford University Press, USA, 2018).

Conspiracy theories